Garra gotyla is a species of ray-finned fish in the cyprinid family from freshwater in South Asia.

There are two subspecies, which are widely regarded as separate species by some authorities (e.g., the IUCN):
 Garra gotyla gotyla (Gray, 1830) – sucker head.
 Garra gotyla stenorhynchus Jerdon, 1849 – Nilgiris garra.

References 

gotyla
Fish of Bangladesh
Fish described in 1830
Taxa named by John Edward Gray